A splicing factor is a protein involved in the removal of introns from strings of messenger RNA, so that the exons can bind together; the process takes place in particles known as spliceosomes.  Genes are progressively switched off as we age, and splicing factors can reverse this trend.

In a research paper, splicing factors were found to be produced upon application of resveratrol analogues, which induced senescent cells to rejuvenate.

Notes

Biochemistry
Spliceosome
Ageing